Ramphocorixa is a genus of water boatmen in the family Corixidae. There are at least two described species in Ramphocorixa.

Species
These two species belong to the genus Ramphocorixa:
 Ramphocorixa acuminata (Uhler, 1897) (acuminate water boatman)
 Ramphocorixa rotundocephala Hungerford, 1927

References

Further reading

 
 

Articles created by Qbugbot
Corixini
Heteroptera genera